

 
Belyuen is a community in the Northern Territory of Australia located on the Cox Peninsula about  south-west of the territorial capital of Darwin.

Belyuen consists of land under the control of the Belyuen aboriginal community council.  It is named after the aboriginal community which was established with the name Delissaville and which was changed in 1975 to Belyuen which is the name of a “nearby waterhole.”  Belyuen is classified as a community rather than as a locality because this is the standard Northern Territory Government description given to administrative areas that were established around the existing aboriginal communities in 2007.  Its boundaries and name were gazetted on 4 April 2007.

The 2016 Australian census which was conducted in August 2016 reports that Belyuen had 164 people living within its boundaries.

Belyuen is located within the federal division of Lingiari, the territory electoral division of Daly and the local government area of the Belyuen Shire.

References

Populated places in the Northern Territory